is a Japanese actress and voice actress.

Biography 
Despite being born in Tokyo, Okamoto was actually raised in Hirakata, Osaka, where she also spent her elementary-school years. In 1961, she made her debut for performing arts activities in comedy. In 1970, she moved back to Tokyo, with subsequent transfer to the headquarters of the city, where she changed her name from "Noda Mutsumi" to her current name. In 1971, she starred in the comedy film Tora-san's Love Call, as an extra.

In 1970, she had made her voice-acting debut in the anime series Inakappe Taishō, where she voiced Kikuko Ogaki. Her first major performances were in the anime television series is Yatterman. From the 1970s to the 1980s, she appeared in many anime works produced by Tatsunoko Production.

Filmography

Anime television 
Inakappe Taishō (1970) - Kikuko Ogaki
Demetan Croaker, The Boy Frog (1973)  - Ranatan
Neo-Human Casshern (1973) - Flora, Morena
The Song of Tentomushi (1974) - Tsukimi Isshu
Vicky the Viking (1974) - Tilde
Dog of Flanders (1975) - Annie
Time Bokan (1975) - Junko
Paul's Miraculous Adventure (1976) - Laura
Yatterman (1977) - Ai/Yatterman-2
Gatchaman II (1978) - Lisa
Space Battleship Yamato II (1978) - Teresa
Tōshō Daimos (1978) - Reiko
Hana no Ko Lunlun (1979) - Lunlun
The Rose of Versailles (1979) - Dianne
Maeterlinck's Blue Bird: Tyltyl and Mytyl's Adventurous Journey (1980) - Sprit of the Light
Ohayō! Spank (1981) - Aiko Morimura
The Three Musketeers (1987) - Queen Anne
City Hunter: .357 Magnum (1989) - Nina Shutenberg
Otoko wa Tsurai yo (Anime series) (1998) - Sakura Suwa
Tegami Bachi (2009) - Louisa
Little Witch Academia (2017) - Professor Lukic
BanG Dream! (2017) - Mami Ichigaya

Anime films 
The Wizard of Oz (1982) - Dorothy Gale

Live-action films 
Karafuto 1945 Summer Hyosetsu no mon (xxxx) - Tomoko Katori
Kigeki: Onna uridashimasu (xxxx) - Asako
Tora's Pure Love (xxxx) - Sayuri Ōzora
The Yellow Handkerchief (1977) - Ramen shop girl
Nomugi Pass (1979) - Ei Kubo

Television drama 
Seigi no Shinboru Kondoruman (1975) - Sayuri Terada
Hanekonma (1986)
Hana no Ran (1994) - Chigusa

Video games 
Bokan Desu yo (1998) - Yatterman-2
Majokko Daisakusen: Little Witching Mischiefs (1999) - Lunlun
Bokan GoGoGo (2001) - Junko, Yatterman-2

Dubbing
The Big Boss (1978 TV Asahi Dub)  – Chiao Mei (Maria Yi)
Death Ship (1983 Fuji TV edition) – Lori (Victoria Burgoyne)
Fist of Fury (1985 TBS Dub) – Yuan Li'er (Nora Miao)
The Magnificent Seven (1974 TV Asahi edition) – Petra (Rosenda Monteros)
Suspiria (1977) (1979 TBS edition) – Suzy Bannion (Jessica Harper)
 Suspiria (2018) – Anke Meier (Jessica Harper)
Way of the Dragon – Chen Ching-hua (Nora Miao)
[[The Wizard of Oz (1939 film)|The Wizard of Oz]]'' (1974 TBS edition) – Dorothy Gale (Judy Garland)

References

External links 
 Official agency profile 
 Mari Okamoto at GamePlaza-Haruka Voice Acting Database 
 
 

1954 births
Living people
Japanese child actresses
Japanese film actresses
Japanese television actresses
Japanese video game actresses
Japanese voice actresses
People from Hirakata
Voice actresses from Tokyo
20th-century Japanese actresses
21st-century Japanese actresses